Crusaders Rugby League enter their 5th year of rugby league, their 2nd in professional rugby league, in 2010. Additionally, this will be their first known as Crusaders Rugby League after previously being known as Celtic Crusaders, and their first year playing away from Brewery Field, Bridgend, moving to Wrexham's Racecourse Ground. They will be in contention for the Super League, in its 15th season and the 2010 Challenge Cup.

Preseason 
The preseason saw the Crusaders make a number of changes firstly the Crusaders changed their name from Celtic Crusaders to Crusaders Rugby League then they got rid of previous coach John Dixon and was replaced by Brian Noble as well as gaining Nobles services Iestyn Harris and Jon Sharp joined as assistant coaches. The preseason also saw Wales take part in the 2009 European Cup which they ended up winning against Scotland 28–16, from the Crusaders 2010 Squad Jordan James, Ben Flower, Elliot Kear, Lewis Mills and Lloyd White were all named in the Wales squad. The Crusaders also confirmed Wrexhams Racecourse Ground as their new home ground for 2010 they originally planned to play at Newports Rodney Parade but unfortunately they couldn't which meant they had to move their South Wales base 200 miles to North Wales. The Crusaders made a number of high-profile signings during the off season with players such as former Great Britain internationals Jamie Thackray and Gareth Raynor joining the club as well as former NRL player Michael Witt returning to the 13-man code after a -year stint with the Otago rugby union club.

Table

2010 results and fixtures

Friendlies

Saturday 16 January (Jon Wells Testimonial match)
Crusaders vs. Harlequins RL – Cancelled

Challenge Cup

Round 4
Crusaders 58 York City Knights 8

Round 5
Crusaders 34–35 Catalans Dragons

Super League XV
For all season results see link below:

Round 1
Crusaders 6–34 Leeds Rhinos

Preview:This was the first game to kick off Super League XV; the game was played at Crusaders new home ground at Wrexham's Racecourse Ground with the 2009 champions Leeds Rhinos versus the 2009 wooden spooners then known as Celtic Crusaders.

Despite a steady if plucky start due to the snowy weather, Crusaders simply could not sustain the pace and shear ability of the champions. Scott Donald and Gareth Raynor exchanged tries, and the 6-all scoreline remained until the 65th minute when Leeds pulled away(scoring 5 tries in the last 20 minutes) to run out comfortable victors. Although their fitness, team chemistry and ability is questionable, if Crusaders can match every game in Super League XV with the level of commitment shown against the champions, they will prosper with a few wins especially with the defence they showed for the first 65 minutes.

Round 2
Wigan Warriors 38–6 Crusaders

Preview: This match will be played at the DW Stadium in Wigan where Brian Noble will come up against the club he previously coached the Wigan Warriors. Former Parramatta Eels second rower Weller Hauraki and former Wests Tigers utility back Rhys Hanbury are expected to arrive in time for the match where they will make their debuts for the Crusaders as they(The Crusaders) still look to build their squad for the 2010 season. Weller Hauraki has been named in the Crusaders 19-man squad however Rhys Hanbury will arrive sometime late February

Team Lineups(19-man squads) Match Official: James Child

Wigan Warriors- Phelps, Roberts, Gleeson, Carmont, Richards, S. Tomkins, Leuluai, Fielden, Riddell, Coley, Hansen, J. Tomkins, O'Loughlin, Prescott, Paleaaesina, Deacon, O'Carroll, Mossop, Goulding.

Crusaders- Youngquest, Mellars, Raynor, Witt, O'Hara, Withers, Bryant, Hauraki, Chan, Trimarchi, Dyer, Lee, Winternstein, Peek, Thackray, James, Flower, White, Lupton.

Match review –

The Crusaders have recorded a second loss to their 2010 Super League season with a 38–6 loss to the Wigan Warriors in front of a 13,680 crowd at the DW Stadium. Wigan tore the Crusaders apart with fullback Cameron Phelps starring in the game, setting up two tries and scoring one of his sides 7 tries. The Crusaders gave a debut to former Parramatta Eels and New Zealand Maori international Weller Hauraki who impressed on his debut. The Crusaders lacked ability to take advantage in the first half with Wigan running out to a scoreline of 20–6 by halftime with Luke Dyer scoring just before the halftime break. It was a similar story in the second half with the Crusaders struggling to get out of their own half of the field, lacking playmaking ability. The Tomkins brother(Sam and Joel) caused trouble for the Crusaders as well as Paul Deacon with his kicking game in the second half.

Round 3
Salford City Reds 16 vs 36 Crusaders

Match review-

This was the Crusaders first win of their 2010 Super League Season giving them some momentum for the in-form Hull who have won 2 from 2. The Crusaders tries came from Vince Mellars who scored 3 tries, while Gareth Raynor, Michael Witt, Frank Winterstein and Jamie Thackray also scoring, Michael Witt landed 4 conversions. For the hosts Karl Fitzpatrick, former Crusaders halfback Matty Smith and former Bulldogs NRL players Daniel Holdsworth scored the tries for Salford, while Stefan Ratchford landed 2 conversions.

Round 4
Crusaders 18–16 Hull

Preview- This will be the Crusaders second home game of the season against the in-form Hull. Crusaders hooker Tommy Lee returns from an ankle injury where he missed last week's win over Salford, he faces his old club (Hull F.C.|Hull) along with Jamie Thackray and Gareth Raynor while second rower Weller Hauraki makes his home debut and as for Hull Mike Burnett replaces Danny Tickle who suffered a groin injury in last week's win over Huddersfield and coach Richard Agar has Danny Washbrook and Jordan Turner on standby in case Sean Long and Richard Horne fail to recover from leg knocks.

Match review-
The Crusaders won their first home game of the season where the match was won in the last few minutes which is the first time they have won two games in the row since entering super league.

Scorecard
Crusaders- 
Tries;Nick Youngquest (2), Michael Witt
Goals; Michael Witt (3)
Hull-
Tries;Kirk Yeaman, Tom Briscoe, Lee Radford
Goals;Craig Fitzgibbon (2)

Round 5
Warrington Wolves 46 Crusaders 12

Round 6
St Helens R.F.C. 37 Crusaders 30

Round 7
Crusaders 14 vs Catalans Dragons 6

Round 8
Castleford Tigers 22 Crusaders 16

Round 9
Bradford Bulls 20 Crusaders 16

Round 10
Crusaders 20 Wakefield Trinity Wildcats 10

Round 11
Huddersfield Giants 38 Crusaders 10

Round 12
Crusaders 19 Bradford 0

Tries: Witt (2), Sammut

Goals: Witt (3/3)

Field Goals: Witt

Round 13
Hull KR 54–0 Crusaders

Round 14
Crusaders 26 Wigan Warriors 46

Round 15
Crusaders 22 Harlequins 50

Round 16
Crusaders 44 Bradford Bulls 20

Round 17
Crusaders 32 Leeds 26

Round 18
Wakefield 41 Crusaders 0

Round 19
Warrington 30 Crusaders 10

Round 20
Huddersfield 30 Crusaders 12

Round 21
Crusaders 26 Catalans 22

Round 22
Crusaders 30 Castleford 24

Round 23
Crusaders 60 Salford 16

Round 24
Crusaders 16 Harlequins 12

Round 25
Hull 18 Crusaders 16

Round 26
St Helens 36 Crusaders 10

Round 27
Crusaders 30 Hull KR 24

2010 squad

2010 Transfers

Gains

Losses

References

Crusaders Rugby League seasons
Crusaders Rugby League season
2010 in Welsh rugby league